The  also known as the Jinguashi Shinto Shrine, Gold Temple or  is a Shinto shrine located halfway up a mountain in the Gold Ecological Park in Jinguashi, Ruifang District, New Taipei City, Taiwan (formerly Kinkaseki, Zuihō town, Kirun district, Taihoku Prefecture during Japanese rule).

Kinkaseki town (now Jinguashi) at the time of Japanese rule was said to have been the number one gold mine town in Asia. During Japanese rule, a grand matsuri was held every year and the mine workers and nearby residents gathered together to celebrate.

Originally, there was a Honden Main Hall, haiden, Temizuya Purification Pavilion, and Sandō Path leading to the shrine. Along the path were three Torii Gates, five flag banner platforms, one copper bull, and ten pairs of stone Tōrō lanterns. After World War II when the Japanese left Taiwan, the shrine was destroyed by vandals and only the stone pillars of the Honden, two Torii Gates, and four pair of stone Tōrō lanterns remain today.

See also 
 Gold Museum (Taiwan)
 List of Shinto shrines in Taiwan

External links 

 About the Gold Ecological Park
  台湾行２〈霧の黄金神社を訪ねて〉 Taiwan Travels 2: Visiting the Ōgon Shrine of the mist vertvert.blogzine.jp. 2006-04-11. Archived from the original on 2011-07-24. Retrieved 2018-08-06 - More pictures of the shrine and a Japanese residential house.

1933 establishments in Taiwan
Buildings and structures in New Taipei
Shinto shrines in Taiwan
Tourist attractions in New Taipei
20th-century Shinto shrines